Andrew Donaldson (23 March 1925 – 20 June 1987) was an English professional footballer who played in the Football League for Exeter City, Middlesbrough and Newcastle United as a centre forward. He scored prolifically for Peterborough United in non-League football and is a member of the club's Hall of Fame.

Career statistics

Honours 
Peterborough United

 Midland League (3): 1955–56, 1956–57, 1957–58
Maunsell Cup (2): 1956–57, 1957–58

Individual

 Peterborough United Hall of Fame

References

1925 births
English footballers
English Football League players
Peterborough United F.C. players
1987 deaths
Footballers from Newcastle upon Tyne
Association football forwards
Newcastle United F.C. players
Middlesbrough F.C. players
Exeter City F.C. players